The Prime Minister's Cup was a football competition organised by the Turkish Football Federation in Turkey. It began in 1944 and continued until 1950 as a unique kind of super cup competition between the winners of the Turkish Football Championship and the Turkish National Division. It was one of the earliest super cups in the world. In 1966, the Turkish Football Federation restarted the competition as a final game between the winners of the second division and the Turkish Amateur Championship and maintained this system until 1970. From 1971 to 1998 the competition was contested between the runners-up of the Super League and the Turkish Cup.

Fenerbahçe are the most successful club, having won the cup eight times.

Winners

1944–1950
Held as a super cup competition between the winners of the Turkish Football Championship and Turkish National Division.

1966–1970
Contested between the winners of the Second League and Turkish Amateur Championship.

1971–1998
Contested between the runners-up of the Turkish Super League and Turkish Cup.

Performance by club

See also
Atatürk Cup
Turkish Cup
Turkish Super Cup

References

 
Defunct football cup competitions in Turkey
1944 establishments in Turkey
Recurring events disestablished in 1998
Recurring sporting events established in 1944
1998 disestablishments in Turkey